The Christmas Angel: A Family Story is a 1998 Christmas album by the band Mannheim Steamroller, their fifth Christmas album. The soundtrack, accompanied by the narration of Chip Davis and Olivia Newton-John, tells the story of a decorative angel that is stolen from the top of a Christmas tree by a villain called the Gargon. The toys under the tree will not become presents until the angel is found. With the toys' help, a young mother defeats the Gargon and Christmas is saved. The script was written by Mark Valenti.

The story was then turned into a figure skating production titled The Christmas Angel: A Story on Ice, starring Dorothy Hamill as the mother, Elvis Stojko as the Gargon, and Tonia Kwiatkowski in the title role of the Angel.

Track listing
 "Introduction" – :57
 "Joy to the World" – 3:38
 "Stille Nacht (Silent Night)" – 5:26
 "Dream" – 3:21
 "Crystal" – 4:21
 "Carol of the Bells" – 3:49
 "Messengers of Christmas" – 3:33
 "Greensleeves" – 3:27
 "Above the Northern Lights" – 5:04
 "Good King Wenceslas" – 3:24
 "Deck the Halls" – 3:55
 "Angels We Have Heard on High" – 4:30

1998 Christmas albums
Mannheim Steamroller albums
American Gramaphone albums
American Gramaphone Christmas albums
Christmas albums by American artists
Classical Christmas albums
New-age Christmas albums